The Cassandra Crossing is a 1976 disaster thriller film directed by George Pan Cosmatos and starring Sophia Loren, Richard Harris, Ava Gardner, Martin Sheen, Burt Lancaster, Lee Strasberg and O. J. Simpson about a disease-infected Swedish terrorist who infects a train's passengers as they head to a derelict arch bridge.

With the backing of the media tycoon Sir Lew Grade (the head of the British broadcast network Associated Television) and the Italian film producer Carlo Ponti, the international all-star cast was expected to attract a widespread audience, with rights sold prior to filming, to both British and American distributors. Ponti also saw the production as a showcase for his wife, Sophia Loren.

Plot
When the existence of a strain of plague (vaguely identified as pneumonic) is revealed at the US mission at the International Health Organization, three terrorists seek to blow up the US mission. Two of them are shot, one mortally, by security personnel, but one escapes. The surviving terrorist is hospitalized and quarantined and identified as Swedish. Elena Stradner and US military intelligence Colonel Stephen Mackenzie argue over the nature of the strain, which Stradner suspects is a biological weapon but which Colonel Mackenzie claims was in the process of being destroyed.

The third terrorist, Eklund, escapes and stows away on a train travelling from Geneva to Stockholm. Stradner believes that the train should be stopped so that the terrorist can be removed and quarantined, but Col. Mackenzie is concerned that all of the passengers on the train might be infected. Mackenzie insists on rerouting the train to a disused railway line which goes to a former Nazi concentration camp in Janov, Poland where the passengers will be quarantined. However, the line crosses a dangerously unsound steel arch bridge known as the Kasundruv Bridge or the "Cassandra Crossing", out of use since 1948.

Mackenzie understands that the bridge might collapse as the train passes over it.
The presence of the infected terrorist, and the rerouting of the train, precipitates the second conflict, among passengers on the train; they include Jonathan Chamberlain, a famous neurologist, his ex-wife Jennifer Rispoli Chamberlain, a former inmate of Janov and Holocaust survivor Herman Kaplan, and Nicole Dressler, the wife of a German arms dealer. She is embroiled in an affair with her young companion Robby Navarro. Navarro is a heroin trafficker being pursued by Interpol agent Haley, who is travelling undercover as a priest.

Mackenzie informs Chamberlain of the presence of Eklund, who is found, but attempts to remove him via a helicopter are unsuccessful because the train enters a tunnel. Chamberlain is also told that the plague has a 60% mortality rate.  Mackenzie, however, informs passengers that police have received reports of anarchist bombs placed along the rail line, and that the train will be rerouted to Nuremberg. There the train is sealed with an enclosed oxygen system and a US Army medical team is placed aboard, with the now-deceased terrorist being placed in a hermetically-sealed coffin. Chamberlain learns of the risk of the Cassandra Crossing. He also begins to suspect the disease is not as serious as originally thought: few of the passengers have become infected and few of those have actually died. He radios MacKenzie suggesting the infected portion of the train be uncoupled and isolated, but MacKenzie, acting under orders, has no intention of stopping the train: if, as expected, the Cassandra Crossing collapses, it will neatly cover the fact that the American military has been harbouring germ warfare agents in a neutral country. Chamberlain and Haley form a group of passengers to overcome the guards and seize control of the train before it reaches the doomed bridge.

After Navarro is killed by the guards trying to reach the engine, and Haley and Kaplan sacrifice themselves, Chamberlain manages to separate the rear half of the train, hoping that with less weight the front half will cross safely. But the bridge collapses, killing everyone aboard the front half. Max, the train's conductor, applies the manual brakes and stops the remaining cars just before reaching the downed bridge. The survivors soon evacuate the remaining cars and head off on foot, no longer under guard or quarantine. In Geneva, both Stradner and MacKenzie depart: she keeps hope of survivors while he feels quiet guilt over the whole affair. After they leave, Major Stack informs MacKenzie's superior that both the colonel and the doctor are under surveillance.

Cast

 Sophia Loren as Jennifer Rispoli Chamberlain
 Richard Harris as Jonathan Chamberlain
 Burt Lancaster as Col. Stephen MacKenzie
 Martin Sheen as Robby Navarro
 Lee Strasberg as Herman Kaplan
 Ava Gardner as Nicole Dressler
 Ingrid Thulin as Elena Stradner
 O. J. Simpson as Haley
 Lionel Stander as Max the Conductor
 Ann Turkel as Susan
 John Phillip Law as Major Stack
 Alida Valli as Nanny
 Lou Castel as Eklund
 Ray Lovelock as Tom
 John P. Dulaney as Bobby
 Thomas Hunter as Captain Scott
 Stefano Patrizi as Lars
 Fausta Avelli as Caterina
 Carlo De Mejo as Alvin
 Renzo Palmer as Alberti

Sources:

Production

The Cinecittà studios in Rome were chosen for interiors, with French and Swiss locales providing most of the location footage. The steel arch bridge depicted in the film is actually the Garabit Viaduct in southern France, built from 1880 to 1884 by Gustave Eiffel, who later constructed the Eiffel tower.

At the beginning of the film passengers arrive at Geneva railway station to embark on the train. The scenes were shot at Basel SBB railway station. Where Dr Chamberlain enters the station, the green coloured BVB trams and Basel's Central Station Square can be seen in the background.

Much of the film's special effects involved models and rear screen work that was largely effective, although the studio artwork shows a typical US diesel locomotive that doesn't resemble anything seen in the film.

Peter O'Toole was offered the lead role, but he turned it down. Richard Harris played the part instead.

The Cassandra Crossing was only the third film made by George Pan Cosmatos. Ava Gardner said "the real reason I'm in this picture is money, baby, pure and simple." Tom Mankiewicz, who worked on the script, dubbed the film The Towering Germ, a reference to another disaster film of the time, The Towering Inferno.

Reception
The film holds a score of 36% on Rotten Tomatoes based on eleven reviews.

Richard Eder of The New York Times called the film "profoundly, offensively stupid," with Ava Gardner "awful in an awful role" and Sophia Loren "totally miscast." Gene Siskel of the Chicago Tribune gave the film 1.5 stars out of 4 and called it "an unintentional parody of a disaster film. The catastrophes that befall the passengers of a Geneva to Copenhagen train in the picture are positively ridiculous." Variety dismissed the film as, "a tired, hokey and sometimes unintentionally funny disaster film in which a trainload of disease-exposed passengers lurch to their fate." Kevin Thomas of the Los Angeles Times called the film "a disaster picture quite literally disastrous and so awful it's unintentionally hilarious." Gary Arnold of The Washington Post wrote, "Cosmatos is an absentminded, huffing-puffing director who seems to keep hoping we'll overlook his frazzled continuity, which suggests an old serial slapped together in such a way that the cliffhanging bits are never resolved." Richard Combs of The Monthly Film Bulletin wrote, "The one remotely enjoyable aspect of The Cassandra Crossing is that it knows no proportion in anything—from performances through plotting, shooting style and special effects, it is constantly outdoing itself in monumental silliness."

The film was booed and hissed at preview screenings by critics.

The graphic scenes of the passengers being killed at the end of the film had ensured an "R" rating in theatres and led to two "censored" and "uncensored" versions being released for broadcast and home media.

Box office

The Cassandra Crossing, however, still made money. The producers claimed that they recouped the production costs of the film out of Japan alone.

References

Bibliography

 Billington, David P. The Tower and the Bridge: The New Art of Structural Engineering. Princeton, New Jersey: Princeton University Press, 1983. .
 Grade, Lew. Still Dancing: My Story. New York: William Collins & Sons, 1987. .
 Mankiewicz, Tom and Robert Crane. My Life as a Mankiewicz. Lexington, Kentucky: University Press of Kentucky, 2012. .
 Verlhac, Pierre-Henri and Yann-Brice Dherbier. Sophia Loren: A Life in Pictures. Brighton, UK: Pavilion, 2008. .
 Walker, Alexander. National Heroes: British Cinema in the Seventies and Eighties. London: Harrap, 1985. .

External links
 
 
 
 
 

1976 films
1970s action thriller films
1970s disaster films
British disaster films
Embassy Pictures films
Films about infectious diseases
Films about viral outbreaks
Films about terrorism in Europe
Films directed by George P. Cosmatos
Films produced by Carlo Ponti
Films scored by Jerry Goldsmith
Films set in West Germany
Films set in Poland
Films set in Switzerland
Films set on trains
Films shot in Switzerland
Films shot in France
Films shot in the Czech Republic
Italian disaster films
English-language Italian films
ITC Entertainment films
Films with screenplays by Tom Mankiewicz
West German films
English-language German films
1970s English-language films
1970s British films
1970s Italian films